Urtzi Urrutikoetxea (born 12 October 1977 in Bilbao, Biscay, Basque Country) is a Basque writer and journalist.

Life
He has worked for the Euskal Telebista (Basque television), as well as in several publications in the Basque language, such as Euskaldunon Egunkaria, Berria, Gara, Jakin, Argia, Nora, Zazpi Haizetara and Bertsolari, among others. As a freelance writer, he has worked in different countries, like Iraq, Georgia (including Abkhazia and South Ossetia), Turkey, Venezuela, Colombia, Mexico, Guatemala, Honduras, Nicaragua, Haiti, Puerto Rico, Moldova, Kosovo and many European nations. Currently he lives in Washington, DC, where he writes for BERRIA and GARA. 

He has published three books of poems, one novel and one travel book (Afrika Express, 2008) in Basque, and one guidebook in Spanish about the city of Berlin, where he has lived and worked as correspondent. He has also worked as correspondent in Istanbul. Urtzi Urrutikoetxea is the translator into Basque of the Hungarian Nobel Prize Laureate Imre Kertész's Fateless and has also published in Basque a version for children of the Kurdish epic poem Mem û Zin. He has also worked in the field of bertsolaritza (oral improvised poetry in the Basque language), collaborating in different projects like the book Bizkaiko Bertsogintza IV (2006). Urrutikoetxea has been the local producer in the Basque Country and translator in some audiovisual projects, such as the documentary An Independent Mind (2008), by Rex Bloomstein, and the report by Gundars Reders in Latvia TV (2008). He was also (2012-2021) the  President of the Euskal PEN / Basque PEN Club. Actually, he is the Chair of the Translation and Linguistic Rights Committee of PEN International.

Works

Poetry
Gaur ere ez du atertuko 1998, Arabako, Foru Aldundia
Borroka galduetatik gatoz (We come from lost struggles) 1997
Utzidazu karmina kentzen 2000, Kutxa

Fiction
Auzoak (Quarters, Neighborhoods) 2005,

Travel books
Guía de Berlín, 2005 
Afrika Express (2008, the story of a car journey from Bilbao to Mali and Senegal)

Essays
 Kurdistan, argi bat ekialde hurbilean (2022)

References

External links
Basque Literature
Urtzi Urrutikoetxea Vacas in the Spanish-language Auñamendi Encyclopedia.

Living people
1977 births
Basque journalists
Basque-language poets
Basque-language writers
People from Bilbao